Ning Cai (born 16 October 1982) is a Singapore Literature Prize-nominated author. She is best recognized for her illusionist/escapologist stage character Magic Babe Ning and was named by Channel News Asia as Southeast Asia's first professional female magician. Cai has been credited with popularizing magic in Singapore.

In October 2014, Cai announced her retirement from performing as Magic Babe Ning to focus on her writing career. Her 2016 Singapore Literature Prize nominated autobiography Who Is Magic Babe Ning? was published soon after. She made a brief return to magic as the Mind Magic Mistress in 2017. To date, she has published three nonfiction books and two fiction books. Her latest bestselling crime fiction novel Misdirection is the first in a young adult trilogy.

Education
Ning Cai was born in Singapore on 16 October 1982 and is the eldest of three sisters. She studied at Methodist Girls School, where she completed both her PSLE and GCE O Level examinations. She was also credited with a certificate of distinction for competing in the Australian Mathematics Competition of 1997.

Upon graduation from Methodist Girls School, she progressed her tertiary education at Ngee Ann Polytechnic, where she pursued a diploma in Film Sound and Video intending to work as a television producer and writer. Her alma mater later officially inducted Cai into their inaugural Hall of Fame in 2011, along with fellow graduates of the School of Film Media Studies, DJs Jamie Yeo and Justin Ang, one half of The Muttons.

Career in magic

2006 to 2009
Cai gained recognition for the magic tricks that she honed over the years from watching David Copperfield and Princess Tenko beginning at the age of 5. In 2006, she joined a local magic competition and placed 2nd runner up. This win led her to decide to be a full-time professional performer after graduating from university.

When Cai first entered the entertainment scene, she was acknowledged as "Singapore’s only professional female magician" by publications including The Straits Times, Lianhe Zaobao, The New Paper, My Paper, Mediacorp Channel 8 News and Lianhe Wanbao. Cai disliked being typecast as the typical female in magic who plays submissive roles to males and only performs magic with silks, flowers, umbrellas, or rabbits, so she incorporated fire-eating, choreography with samurai swords, twirling fire balls, spikes, and weapons in her shows.

In October 2014, after 10 years performing, Cai announced that she would be retiring from her work as stage character Magic Babe Ning. She had risen to an international status, performing for royalty in Oman and appearing on television in Europe, Asia, and the UK. She cited her upcoming wedding that December and her desire to focus on writing for her retirement.

Writing career

Cai received an MSc in Creative Writing at the University of Edinburgh, Scotland. She graduated with distinction in November 2019 and has since resided permanently in Switzerland.

Cai has also collaborated with her longtime friend and mentor, John Teo, president of the International Brotherhood of Magicians (Singapore) in creating a dual-cover activity book Game of Thoughts: Understanding Creativity Through Mind Games, a book that invokes creativity within readers through a series of 'brain teasers, puzzles conundrums, thought experiments and writing exercises'.

In November 2016, Cai's middle grade novel Magicienne was published. It was co-written by Don Bosco, an award-winning Singaporean author for children's books. The fiction book features a young protagonist who has been described as a 'younger version of Magic Babe'.

In April 2018, Cai launched the first book of her young adult trilogy. Titled Misdirection: Book 1 of the Savant Trilogy, the book follows dynamic parkour champion, Maxine Schooling, who wakes up from a three-year coma and discovers that her family has been murdered by a killer still at large. Cai's original manuscript was previously longlisted for the Epigram Books Fiction Prize in 2016 and subsequently reworked and published by Epigram Books. Her book has spent six consecutive weeks on The Straits Times bestsellers list.

Literary influences 
Cai has cited various literary figures as her influences, such as Neil Gaiman, Terry Moore, and Elizabeth Watasin. The fictitious nature of the works by these authors has translated to many of her ideas as a writer.

Other projects

Cai serves as the creative director of Mighty Magic Lab, a kids edutainment company which focuses on empowering the creativity and confidence of children through magic. The educational shows highlight important messages like fire safety, self-confidence, and ill effects of smoking.

In 2015, Cai organized a local book hunt called #SG50books50days, an initiative to generate interest in reading books by local authors. Over the course of 50 days, she left 50 books from various authors at 50 different locations, to which she left clues via social media. Books published by local authors such as Neil Humphreys were obtained by those who managed to solve the clues.

Bibliography 
 Adventures of 2 Girls (Marshall Cavendish, 2012) – With Pamela Ho
 Who Is Magic Babe Ning? (Marshall Cavendish, 2015) – Foreword by Neil Gaiman
 Game of Thoughts: Understanding Creativity Through Mind Games (Marshall Cavendish, 2016) – with John Teo
 Magicienne: A Novel (Marshall Cavendish, 2016) – With Don Bosco
 Misdirection: Book One of The Savant Trilogy (Epigram Books, 2018)

References

See also
 Ultimate Magic

External links
Official website
Adventures of 2 Girls website

Living people
1982 births
Singaporean people of Chinese descent
Singaporean magicians
Female magicians